Ratnasingham Shivaji is an American mathematician, focusing in applied math and mathematical biology, currently the H. Barton Excellence Professor at University of North Carolina at Greensboro and formerly a W. L. Giles Distinguished Professor at Mississippi State University.

He was included in the 2019 class of fellows of the American Mathematical Society "for contributions to the theory of semipositone elliptic questions applied to reaction diffusion systems, for mentoring and for providing leadership for the inception of a doctoral program in mathematics".

References

Year of birth missing (living people)
Living people
University of North Carolina faculty
Mississippi State University faculty
20th-century American mathematicians
Fellows of the American Mathematical Society